is a former Japanese football player.

Playing career
Chiba was born in Miyagi Prefecture on May 22, 1968. After graduating from Sendai University, he joined the Honda Football Club in 1991. However he did not play in any matches. He moved to the Kashima Antlers in 1992. Although he played 5 matches in the 1992 J.League Cup, he did not play in any matches after Masaaki Furukawa joined in 1993. He moved to the newly formed J1 League club, Kashiwa Reysol, in 1995. However he did not play in many matches and he moved to the Japan Football League club Brummell Sendai in 1996. He retired at the end of the 1997 season.

Club statistics

References

External links

awx.jp

1968 births
Living people
Sendai University alumni
Association football people from Miyagi Prefecture
Japanese footballers
Japan Soccer League players
J1 League players
Japan Football League (1992–1998) players
Honda FC players
Kashima Antlers players
Kashiwa Reysol players
Vegalta Sendai players
Association football goalkeepers